The 1905 Washington football team was an American football team that represented the University of Washington during the 1905 college football season. In its first season under coach Oliver Cutts, the team compiled a 5–2–2 record and outscored its opponents by a combined total of 96 to 52. Tom McDonald was the team captain.

Schedule

References

Washington
Washington Huskies football seasons
Washington football